Athenodoros Cordylion (or Athenodorus, ; fl. early-mid 1st century BC) was a Stoic philosopher, born in Tarsus. He was the keeper of the library at Pergamon, where he was known to cut out passages from books on Stoic philosophy if he disagreed with them:

In his old age, Athenodorus relocated to Rome, where he lived with Cato the Younger until his death.

Notes

1st-century BC deaths
1st-century BC philosophers
Hellenistic-era philosophers from Anatolia
Librarians of Pergamon
Roman-era philosophers in Rome
Roman-era Stoic philosophers
Year of birth unknown
People from Tarsus, Mersin
Year of death missing